No Trace is a 1950 British crime film directed by John Gilling and starring Hugh Sinclair, Dinah Sheridan and John Laurie. The working title of the film was Murder by the Book. The screenplay concerns a crime writer who murders a blackmailer, and is then asked to help solve the case by the police.

It was made at Twickenham Studios and on location in London and Buckinghamshire.

Cast
 Hugh Sinclair as Robert Southley
 Dinah Sheridan as Linda
 John Laurie as Inspector MacDougall
 Barry Morse as Sergeant Harrison
 Dora Bryan as Maisie Phelps
 Michael Brennan as Mike Fenton
 Anthony Pendrell as Stevens
 Michael Ward as Clooney
 Ernest Butcher as Fern
 Madoline Thomas as Mrs Green
 Beatrice Varley as Mrs Finch
 Sidney Vivian as Barman
 Hal Osmond as Taxi driver
 Sam Kydd as Mechanic

Critical reception
TV Guide wrote "Though a tightly controlled, well-paced thriller, there are few surprises; the characterizations are well played, and the direction shows a good feel for excitement"; while DVD Talk noted "Not a bad film as much as it is merely diverting."

References

External links

1950 films
British crime films
1950 crime films
Films directed by John Gilling
Films set in London
Films shot at Twickenham Film Studios
British black-and-white films
1950s English-language films
1950s British films